James Robert Obradovich (born January 7, 1953 in Los Angeles, California) is a former professional American football tight end in the National Football League for the New York Giants, San Francisco 49ers, and Tampa Bay Buccaneers. His 80 career tackles on kickoff coverage are the most in Buccaneer history.

College career
Obradovich played college football for the Trojans of the University of Southern California and was drafted in the seventh round of the 1975 NFL Draft.

References

1953 births
Living people
Players of American football from Los Angeles
American football tight ends
New York Giants players
San Francisco 49ers players
Tampa Bay Buccaneers players
USC Trojans football players